Arthothelium is a genus of lichenized fungi in the family Arthoniaceae.

Species

As accepted by Species Fungorum:
 Arthothelium ampliatum 
 Arthothelium atrorubrum 
 Arthothelium aurantiacopruinosum 
 Arthothelium cinereoargenteum 
 Arthothelium desertorum 
 Arthothelium dictyosporum 
 Arthothelium diffluens 
 Arthothelium evanescens 
 Arthothelium feuereri 
 Arthothelium frischianum 
 Arthothelium huegelii 
 Arthothelium hymeniicola 
 Arthothelium infuscatum 
 Arthothelium interveniens 
 Arthothelium isidiatum 
 Arthothelium japonicum 
 Arthothelium lirellans 
 Arthothelium macounii 
 Arthothelium macrothecum 
 Arthothelium microsporum 
 Arthothelium miesii 
 Arthothelium norvegicum 
 Arthothelium orbilliferum 
 Arthothelium polycarpum 
 Arthothelium pulverulentum 
 Arthothelium punctatum 
 Arthothelium ruanum 
 Arthothelium scandinavicum 
 Arthothelium spectabile 
 Arthothelium subspectabile 
 Arthothelium velatius

References

Gallery

Arthoniaceae
Arthoniomycetes genera
Lichen genera
Taxa described in 1852
Taxa named by Abramo Bartolommeo Massalongo